Au Sin Ying (born 8 January, 1989 in Hong Kong) is a Hong Kong sabre fencer.

Au earned a bronze medal in the Pattaya City World Cup in 2010. The same year, she won an individual silver medal and a team bronze medal at the Asian Games in Guangzhou, China.

She was one of the torchbearers for the 2011 University Games.

Au represented Hong Kong at the 2012 Summer Olympics in London, where she competed in the women's individual sabre event. She lost in the first round to Tunisian fencer and two-time Olympian Azza Besbes, with a final score of 13–15. She reached the table of 32 at the 2014 World Championships in Kazan after defeating Venezuela's Alejandra Benítez, but lost to eventual bronze medallist Vassiliki Vougiouka of Greece.

Au is a resident athlete of the Hong Kong Fencing Association, and is coached and trained by Wong Yuet Kei.

References

External links

NBC Olympics Profile

1989 births
Living people
Hong Kong female sabre fencers
Fencers at the 2012 Summer Olympics
Olympic fencers of Hong Kong
Fencers at the 2010 Asian Games
Fencers at the 2014 Asian Games
Fencers at the 2018 Asian Games
Asian Games silver medalists for Hong Kong
Asian Games bronze medalists for Hong Kong
Asian Games medalists in fencing
Medalists at the 2010 Asian Games
Medalists at the 2014 Asian Games
Alumni of Hong Kong Baptist University
21st-century Hong Kong women